Peta "Bunny" Guinness (née Ellis; born 16 December 1955) is a British chartered landscape architect, journalist and radio personality who is a regular panellist on the long-running BBC Radio 4 programme, Gardener's Question Time. She also writes a weekly column in the Sunday Telegraph. She presented The Great Garden Challenge on Channel 4 in 2005.

Guinness gained a BSc honours degree in horticulture at Reading University, after which she qualified as a landscape architect at Birmingham Polytechnic (now Birmingham City University). She was awarded an honorary doctorate by the University in 2009.

She exhibits regularly at the Chelsea Flower Show, where she has won six gold medals. Her core business, Bunny Guinness Landscape Design Limited, is based near Peterborough in the East Midlands of England.

She was listed in House & Garden magazine in 2021 as one of the top 50 garden designers in the UK.

Family
Her father was Squadron Leader Peter William Ellis, DFC and her mother Barbara Helen Stockitt (née Austin). She married  Kevin Michael Rundell Guinness in 1976, a member of the Guinness brewing family. Her mother is sister of rose breeder David C.H. Austin, who named a rose after her. Her daughter, Unity, has a degree in landscape architecture and works with her. Her son, Freddie, decided to pursue a different path and is studying medicine at St. George's College, University of London.

Bunny is a nickname given by her family; as a baby her dark eyes made her resemble a currant bun.

Bibliography
Gardener's Question Time: All Your Gardening Problems Solved (with co-authors John Cushnie, Bob Flowerdew, Pippa Greenwood, Anne Swithinbank, and photographs from The Garden Picture Gallery and others, paperback, 325 pages, Bookmart Limited, 2005)
Family Gardens: How to Create Magical Spaces for All Ages (paperback, 128 pages, David & Charles, 2008)

References

External links
Official website

Alumni of Birmingham City University
Alumni of the University of Reading
British television presenters
Living people
English gardeners
1955 births
Bunny